Vesyolaya Polyana is a rural locality (a village) in Starokosteyevsky Selsoviet, Bakalinsky District, Bashkortostan, Russia. The population was 5 as of 2010. There is 1 street.

Geography 
Vesyolaya Polyana is located 29 km west of Bakaly (the district's administrative centre) by road. Yurminka is the nearest rural locality.

References 

Rural localities in Bakalinsky District